Typopsilopa is a genus of shore flies in the family Ephydridae. There are about 19 described species in Typopsilopa.

Species
These 19 species belong to the genus Typopsilopa:

T. antennalis Wirth, 1968 i c g
T. antennata Canzoneri & Meneghini, 1969 c g
T. archboldi Wirth, 1968 c g
T. arnaudi Wirth, 1968 i c g
T. atra (Loew, 1862) i c g
T. chinensis (Wiedemann, 1830) c g
T. dimidiata Canzoneri & Meneghini, 1969 c g
T. electa (Becker, 1903) c g
T. ethiopiae Wirth, 1968 c g
T. inca Wirth, 1968 c g
T. keiseri Wirth, 1968 c g
T. kerteszi Papp, 1975 c g
T. manni Wirth, 1968 c g
T. miyagii Wirth, 1968 c g
T. moruensis Canzoneri & Raffone, 1987 c g
T. natalensis Wirth, 1956 c g
T. nigra (Williston, 1896) i c g b
T. nigritella Canzoneri & Meneghini, 1969 c g
T. spinulosa Wirth, 1968 c g

Data sources: i = ITIS, c = Catalogue of Life, g = GBIF, b = Bugguide.net

References

Further reading

 

Ephydridae
Articles created by Qbugbot